Erik Leif Haugelund Hermansen (2 November 1925 – 27 December 2005) was a Danish rower. He competed at the 1952 Summer Olympics in Helsinki with the men's eight where they were eliminated in the semi-finals repêchage.

References

1925 births
2005 deaths
Danish male rowers
Olympic rowers of Denmark
Rowers at the 1952 Summer Olympics
People from Frederiksværk
European Rowing Championships medalists
Sportspeople from the Capital Region of Denmark